Sibagat, officially the Municipality of Sibagat,  is a 1st class municipality in the province of Agusan del Sur, Philippines. According to the 2020 census, it has a population of 33,957 people.

Located at the northernmost of the province, the town is called as the "Gateway to Agusan del Sur" and "The Last Frontier of Agusan del Sur".

The town is a major producer of agriculture products such as coconut, banana, vegetables and especially abaca in the province.

Etymology
The word Sibagat is from the word bagat which means "meet" or "meeting place". According to the oral history, the Sibagat River near Sibagat was the place where the warring tribes meet and fight. Sibagat River is tributary of a bigger river, the Wawa River. The losing tribe would retreat downstream to the Wawa River and disappear.

History
The territories of Sibagat were formerly part of the town of Esperanza, in the historical province of Agusan. In August 1961, through Executive Order No. 440, s. 1961, the barrios and sitios of Bayugan, Maygatasan, Nueva Sibagat, Verdo, Mambutay, Salvacion, Caridad, Sagmone, Calaitan, Sinadyap, Malindao, Noli and other adjacent barrios and sitios were separated from Esperanza and constituted into the newly created municipality of Bayugan. On February 1, 1980, Sibagat was created into a municipality when the barangays of Ilihan, Sinai, Sibagat, El Rio, Afga, Tabontabon, Perez, Magsaysay, Santa Cruz, Santa Maria, San Isidro, Villangit, Del Rosario, Anahauan, Mahayahay and San Vicente were segregated from the municipality of Bayugan and organized into the newly created town, through Batas Pambansa Blg. 56. The seat of Municipal Local Government is located in Barangay Sibagat, now called Barangay Poblacion. On November 6, 1980, the first set of Municipal Officials assumed office and Mr. Vicente B. Benigian, Sr. was the first appointed Municipal Mayor.

Geography
According to the Philippine Statistics Authority, the municipality has a land area of  constituting  of the  total area of Agusan del Sur.

Sibagat is bordered by the Municipalities of Santiago, Agusan del Norte and Cantilan, Surigao del Sur to the north; Madrid, Surigao del Sur, Carmen, Surigao del Sur and Lanuza, Surigao del Sur to the northeast; City of Tandag and San Miguel, Surigao del Sur to the east; Bayugan to the south and southeast; Las Nieves, Agusan del Norte to the southwest; Butuan and Remedios T. Romualdez, Agusan del Norte to the west; and Cabadbaran to the northwest.

The town is geographically situated between the two cities of Butuan and Bayugan.

Elevation 
Elevation of most areas of the municipality sit atop 100 meters above sea level (M.a.s.l.).

Starting from the 100 M.a.s.l.broad plains in the southern part; where the urban center located, most of the rural barangays are located through the hills in the central part and to the mountainous western part, mountains peaked at 1,000 meters above sea level were located at the northern part comprises 2 barangays of Kolambugan and Padiay.

Rivers and Streams 
Sibagat is host of several major rivers and streams that includes the Wawa River, the largest and longest river in the town. The other rivers are Sibagat River, Tambagoko River, Tago River, Andanan River, Boguko River, Bugsukan River, Balangubang River and Managong River.

Watershed 
Andanan River and its surrounding areas was declared as a nature reserve called the Andanan Watershed Forest reserve (AWFR) proclaimed by virtue of Philippine Presidential Proclamation No. 734 dated May 29, 1991 with an area of 15,097 hectares located in Barangay New Tubigon in the municipality of Sibagat including some riverbank barangays in Bayugan area

Sibagat River and Wawa River and its surrounding areas were also declared a nature reserve by establishing the Sibagat-Wawa Forest Reserve (SWFR) as proclaimed by virtue of Philippine Presidential Proclamation No. 308 dated September 3, 1964 for wood production, watershed management, soil protection, and other forest uses containing an area of 29,500 hectares, more or less.

Climate
Sibagat has a Type II climate which has no dry season but with pronounced maximum rain period occurring from December to January. The climate is hot and moist with an average annual humidity of 84 percent. This type of climate is very regular with no dry months and lacks any seasonal contrast. Average annual temperature range is from 23 to 32 Celsius, with the temperatures dropping towards the west portion of the town while altitude is increasing.

Barangays
Sibagat is politically subdivided into 24 barangays.

Demographics

In the 2020 census, Sibagat had a population of 33,957.

Most of the inhabitants are Visayan migrants from Bohol, Cebu, Leyte and Negros provinces. Indigenous people include the Manobo and Higaonon.

Economy

Agriculture 
The economy of Sibagat is dependent heavily on subsistence agriculture. Its major agricultural products are coconut, corn, coffee, cacao, fruits, vegetables, and root crops.

Trade and Industry 
The town of Sibagat plays a major role in Abacá Industry in Agusan del Sur as well as the entire Caraga Region.

The Sibagat Federation of Abaca Weavers Association (SAWA), Inc. — as Sibagat town is leading and major producer of "sinamay" (woven abaca fiber) that played vital role in the growing and production of abaca products in the province. Abaca is identified as "One Town One Product" (OTOP). Their major product is Sinamay, a woven stalks of the abaca tree which fiber is stronger than cotton or silk, and as a result of that sinamay holds a very firm shape. Sibagat "sinamay" shines every time they will participate in trade fairs in both regional and national events. Members of Sibagat Abaca Weavers Association (SAWA) make rolls of fabric from sinamay or the first-class fiber from the Tagongon and Laylay varieties of abaca. The woven fabric is used as material for handicraft, housewares and fashion accessories, which are sold in the home and export markets.

The Kolambugan Tribal Tree Farmers Association (KATTFA) is a major player of abaca trading. A licensed abaca local trader based in Kolambugan, Sibagat, Agusan del Sur authorized by the Philippine Fiber Industry Development Authority (PFIDA).

Energy
Global Sibagat Hydro Power Corporation is a subsidiary of Jowood Industries Inc., Philippines. The company has initially awarded by the Department of Energy (DOE) a Renewable Energy (RE) Service contracts for multiple hydropower projects in the Municipality of Sibagat with a combined potential capacity of 24-Megawatts (MW). The said contracts were executed through a ceremonial signing with Global Sibagat President James G. Ong and the then Energy Secretary Jericho Petilla last February 6, 2014. The RE projects are the Managong Hydroelectric Power Plant (6MW), Wawa Hydro Power Plant (13MW) and Bugsukan Hydro Power Plant (5MW) all located in Sibagat, Agusan del Sur.

Hydro Power Plant Projects
The Department of Energy (DOE) have identified various Renewable Energy power plant projects and awarded service contracts to the below list of hydropower projects all located in the Municipality of Sibagat.
13MW Wawa Hydropower Plant Project - 
6MW Managong Hydroelectric Power Plant Project - Location: Managong Falls, Barangay Padiay
5MW Bugsukan Hydropower Plant Project - Location: Bugsukan River, Barangay Tabontabon,
5MW Hilong-hilong 4 Hydropower Plant Project - Location: Barangay Kolambugan
7.7MW Wawa 1 Hydropower Project - Location: Wawa River, Barangay Kolambugan and Padiay
7.0MW Wawa 2 Hydropower Project - Location: Wawa River, Barangay Kolambugan and Padiay
5.6MW Wawa 3 Hydropower Project - Location: Managong River, Barangay Padiay

Government

Elected officials
Members of the Sibagat Municipal council (2022-2025):

Executive officials:
 Municipal Mayor: Dr. Thelma Gonzaga Lamanilao, MD
 Municipal Vice Mayor: Maria Liza Lamanilao Evangelista, CPA, REB, ENP

Municipal councilors:
 Aljun Pagyos Cayawan
 Josephine Dacera Benegian
 Jovan Aplicador Duarte
 Salvador Palban Bares, Jr.
 Roland Canono Vergara
 Mark Vincent Borres Muldez
 Gines Gablines Coranes
 Francisco Pagoyo Garlit

Infrastructure

Communications
The Philippine Long Distance Telephone Company provides fixed line services. Wireless mobile communications services are provided by Smart Communications and Globe Telecommunications.

Transportation

By Land 
All means of land transportation including Public Utility Buses (PUB), most common are "Bachelor Express" and ''Davao Metro Shuttle" including "Surigao Express" and "Land Car Inc (LCI)" plying the routes of Butuan-Davao, Butuan-San Luis, Butuan-San Francisco, Butuan-Mangagoy and Butuan-Tandag via Pan-Philippine Highway Butuan-Agusan-Davao Road. There are also Public Utility Jeepneys (PUJ) and Passenger Vans plying Butuan-Sibagat-Bayugan route.

Sibagat can be reached also by land directly from Manila, Cubao, Pasay, Bicol and Visayas plying to Davao City routes and vice versa through Philtranco and PP Bus Line via Pan-Philippine Highway.

By Air 
Butuan Airport (also referred as Bancasi Airport) is the nearest airport.

Davao Airport (also referred as Francisco Bangoy International Airport) can be an alternate route from Manila or Cebu to Davao City as transit point.

Surigao Airport can also be an alternate route from Manila or Cebu to Surigao City as transit point.

By Sea 
Inter-island vessels with the likes of M/V Filipinas vessels of Cokaliong Shipping Lines, Trans-Asia Shipping Lines and 2GO Travel of 2GO Group (the latest operator of the remnants of formerly famous SuperFerry fleet, Negros Navigation fleet and Cebu Ferries) plying the Manila-Cebu-Nasipit, Manila-Surigao-Nasipit, Manila-Cagayan de Oro-Nasipit, Cebu-Nasipit, Tagbilaran-Nasipit and Dumaguete-Nasipit routes on regular schedules with Nasipit Port as transit point. Public Utility Buses, Public Utility Jeepneys, Passenger Vans and Multicabs are available at Nasipit Port Wharf going to Butuan Integrated Bus Terminal.

Local transportation 
Motorcycle taxi, locally known as Habal-habal, is a single motorcycle modified with outriggers to seat more than two persons that caters passengers from Sibagat town proper to adjacent barangays and remote villages with rough and steep terrain. In Sibagat town, the more complex Habal-habal can seat up to twelve persons or more including their baggage.

Media
DXCN-FM 99.1 Radyo Kaagapay - the only broadcast radio station in the town of Sibagat. The Nutriskwela Community Radio is a Project of the National Nutrition Council (Philippines) to address the problem of hunger and malnutrition in the Philippines by providing correct and updated Nutrition and Health information to areas with high prevalence of malnutrition and no access to broadcast media. It was implemented in 2008, and Radyo Kaagapay in Sibagat, Agusan del Sur was its pioneering recipient in Caraga.

Education

Central elementary schools

Secondary schools
There are Six (6) high schools in the town.

College

Father Saturnino Urios College of Sibagat, Inc. (FSUCSI), is the oldest private educational institution in Sibagat. Founded in 1968 by Rev. Fr. Atanacio B. De Castro, S.J. the school named after the Spanish Jesuit Missionary Father Saturnino Urios, S.J. It is a Catholic Private School that run by the Diocese of Butuan located at the heart of Sibagat within the compound of Saint Anthony of Padua Parish along the Daang Maharlika Pan-Philippine Highway in Barangay Poblacion. The institution is also a sister school of Father Saturnino Urios University in Butuan. It offers complete Kindergarten, Elementary, Secondary Education and Senior high school. It is also an accredited Technical Education and Skills Development Authority (TESDA) Training Center for their TVET courses.

Other Schools

Other Educational and Learning Institutions

Notable personalities

 Dennis Laurente — (Barangay Mahayahay), a Filipino Professional Boxer and a former holder of World Boxing Council Asian Boxing Council (WBC ABC) Super Welterweight Champion belt. Born in Palompon, Leyte but raised in Barangay Mahayahay, Sibagat. He attended his early education at Mahayahay Elementary School and secondary at Sibagat National High School of Home Industries.

References

External links

 [ Philippine Standard Geographic Code]

Municipalities of Agusan del Sur